Markes is a surname. Notable people with the surname include:

Julie Markes, American writer
Larry Markes (1921–1999), American comedian, singer, and screenwriter
Ronny Markes (born 1988), Brazilian mixed martial artist

See also
 Markes, Pennsylvania